Badman's Gold is a 1951 American Western film directed by Robert Emmett Tansey and starring Johnny Carpenter, Alyn Lockwood and Clarke Stevens.

Plot
A US Marshall is called in to investigate a series of robberies on gold shipments carried on a stage line.

Cast
 Johnny Carpenter as Johnny Carpenter 
 Alyn Lockwood as Bess Benson 
 Clarke Stevens as Bob Benson 
 Kenne Duncan as Rance 
 Vern Teters as Sheriff Masters 
 Jack Daly as Professor
 Emmett Lynn as Wiggins - Miner 
 Bill Chaney as Shorty - Henchman 
 Bill Chandler as Bart - Henchman 
 Quentin Sondergaard as Rambo - Henchman 
 Frank Marlowe as Jake - Henchman 
 John Hamilton as The Marshal 
 Bob Reich as Jeff

References

Bibliography
 Pitts, Michael R. Western Movies: A Guide to 5,105 Feature Films. McFarland, 2012.

External links
 

1951 films
1951 Western (genre) films
1950s English-language films
American Western (genre) films
Films directed by Robert Emmett Tansey
Eagle-Lion Films films
American black-and-white films
1950s American films